William Charles Steadman (12 July 1851 – 20 July 1911), usually known as W. C. Steadman, was a prominent trade unionist and Liberal or Lib-Lab politician.

Life 
Born in Poplar, London, Steadman began work at the age of eight, and in 1866 became a barge builder.  In 1873, he joined the River Thames Barge Builders Trades Union, becoming its general secretary in 1879 and holding the post until 1908.  In 1890, he led a successful eighteen-week strike, raising his profile.
In 1892, Steadman was elected as a Progressive Party member of London County Council, representing Stepney. In the 1892 general election he unsuccessfully stood as the Liberal Party candidate for Mid Kent; he lost again in the 1895 election in Hammersmith.

He joined the Fabian Society.
Steadman was finally elected as a Lib–Lab Member of Parliament (MP) for Stepney at the March by-election in 1898 which took place because of the death of F. W. Isaacson in February, who had held the seat since 1896.

This meant that he now represented Stepney both in Parliament and on the London County Council, having been re-elected there in elections in 1895 and 1898.
In 1899, he was elected to the Parliamentary Committee (later the General Council) of the Trades Union Congress (TUC), and in 1902 he was its President.
Steadman lost his seat in Parliament at the 1900 general election to Major William Evans-Gordon.

He continued to represent Stepney on the LCC, being re-elected there in 1901 and 1904. He went on to chair the first conference of the Labour Representation Committee, but left the organisation when asked to leave the Liberal Party.  In 1904, he was elected as the Parliamentary Secretary of the TUC, the post which later became the General Secretary.

In 1906, Steadman again stood for the Liberal Party, and won Finsbury Central.

He lost the seat in the January 1910 general election.

In 1911, he announced his intention to stand down from his TUC post, but died, aged 60, before this could take effect.

Election results

References

Oxford Dictionary of National Biography

External links 

1851 births
1911 deaths
People from Poplar, London
General Secretaries of the Trades Union Congress
British trade union leaders
Liberal Party (UK) MPs for English constituencies
Liberal-Labour (UK) MPs
UK MPs 1895–1900
UK MPs 1906–1910
Members of London County Council
Members of the Parliamentary Committee of the Trades Union Congress
Presidents of the Trades Union Congress
Progressive Party (London) politicians
Chairs of the Labour Party (UK)
Members of the Fabian Society